The Atomic Energy Organization of Iran (AEOI) is the main Iranian government agency responsible for operating nuclear energy and nuclear fuel cycle installations in Iran. AEOI is the primary organization responsible for nuclear technology research and development activities in Iran. AEOI was involved in formerly undeclared nuclear activities including enrichment facilities at Fordow and Natanz.

AEOI's headquarters are in the northern Amir Abad district in Tehran, but it has facilities throughout the country. The current head of AEOI is Mohammad Eslami, who replaced Ali Akbar Salehi on 29 August 2021.

Divisions
 Nuclear Fuel Production Division (NFPD): Research and development on the nuclear fuel cycle, including uranium exploration, mining, milling, conversion, and nuclear waste management; departments include Jaber Ibn Hayan Research Dept., Exploration and Mining Dept., Benefication and Hydrometallurgical Research Center, Nuclear Fuel Research and Production Center, Waste Management Dept., and Saghand Mining Dept.
 Nuclear Power Plant Division (NPPD): Responsible for planning, construction, commissioning, decommissioning and nuclear safety of nuclear power plants in Iran.
 Engineering and Technical Supervision Department (ETSD): Design, review, evaluation and approval of engineering and technical documents, participation and quality control.
 Research Division: Responsible for planning and guiding research projects; has eight affiliated research centers: Nuclear Research Center, Research Center for Lasers and their Application; Nuclear Fusion Research Center, Gamma Irradiation Center, Center for Renewable Energy Development, Nuclear Research Center for Agriculture and Medicine (Karaj), Yazd Radiation Processing Center, and Bonab Research Center.
 International Affairs Department (IAD): Oversees cooperation with AEOI counterparts abroad and drafts documents on AEOI policies; maintains a delegation at the IAEA in Vienna, Austria and one in Moscow, Russia.

Presidents

See also
Nuclear program of Iran
Science in Iran
Energy of Iran
International rankings of Iran
List of Iranian nuclear negotiators

References

External links
Official website
About the Atomic Energy Organization of Iran on the NTI website
About the Atomic Energy Organization of Iran on the Britannica website

Nuclear organizations
Nuclear program of Iran
Government agencies of Iran
Nuclear technology organizations of Iran